Akkarakkaazhchakal (Malayalam: അക്കരക്കാഴ്ച്ചകൾ) is a Malayalam language Indian sitcom that aired on Kairali TV from 2008 to 2010. The series consisted of fifty episodes which chronicled the lives of a middle-class Malayali family settled in the United States . The show was created by Abi Varghese and Ajayan Venugopalan and starred relative newcomers as the leads.

The show is regarded as the first true Malayalam sitcom with real-life situations and witty dialogues minus any drama or artificiality seen in other Indian serials. The series was a refreshing break for the Malayalee audience who were fed on a staple diet of treacle-filled and unrealistic TV serials. It broke broadcasting conventions when it was uploaded into YouTube in its entirety by the show's creators. Akkarakazhchakal has enjoyed widespread popularity during its initial run as well as the subsequent years. The series has been especially commended for its realistic portrayal of real-life Malayali life, social commentary and satirical humour. Josekutty Valiyakallumkal has been widely praised for his portrayal of George Thekkinmoottil, the patriarch of the family.

The show's popularity lead to a film titled Akkarakazhchakal: The Movie.

Characters

The show focuses on George Thekumoottil (Josekutty Valiyakallumkal), a struggling insurance agent. His wife Rincy (Sajini Sachariah) is a nurse who prefers a more luxurious life. While George and Rincy grew up in Kerala, India, their children Matt (Febin Joseph) and Chakki mol (Felisha Joseph) were born and raised in the United States and prefer the American way of living. The show also features Jacob Gregory as George's insurance assistant, Giri Giri and Paulose Palatty as George's father.

Other episodes follow the lives of Mahi (Hari Dev) and Babykuttan (Sanjeev Nair), two nurses who recently immigrated from Kerala, India and their housemates Krish (Jayan Mathew) and Baiju (Geo Thomas), who moved in with them after losing their jobs during the IT recession.

Other recurring characters include Pallilachan (Jose Paramus), a priest from the New Jersey church, Rincy's friend Shiny (Shine Roy) and Shiny's husband Jacob Embranthiri (Saji Sebastin).

Premise

George Thekkinmootil is a Malayali from Aymanam. He moved to the U.S., after marrying Rincy who is a nurse working in New Jersey. Having grown up in Kerala, he is often nostalgic and emotional about his homeland. Rincy, by contrast has accustomed to the American life, and is not bothered much by it. A running gag throughout the show is the cultural divide between George and his children. Though he is critical of their embracement of the American culture, he is a loving father and often tells them how fortunate they are to enjoy such a great life in America. At the onset of the series, George is stuck in a job that he dislikes and tries launching various businesses, all of which backfire. He finally settles down as an insurance agent after clearing the Insurance License Exam, and starts his own Insurance firm.

Girigiri is George's ever-stammering insurance assistant. Even though his actual name is Gregory, George calls him "Girigiri" because of his stammering. His constant need for snacks is often criticized by George. Rincy is very fond of Girigiri and considers him like the younger brother she never had. Girigiri walks out after being irritated by Appachan, and Candy is recruited to take his place. But soon Girigiri joins back as Candy steals George's laptop & runs away and He got fired from his job.

Another plot line that runs parallel to George's is Mahi and Babykuttan. They lands in the U.S. through George's cousin, who is a placement agent in New Jersey. On their very first day, they almost ended up being arrested by a cop (Richard Lampone) after the fire alarm went off because they burned an omelet. The police officer mistook their Puttu Kodam, used for making Puttu, for a marijuana vaporizer.

There are a few episodes in which Appachan prepares grape pickles around the grape season, and Girigiri helps him sell them in the local Indian grocery store under the brand name Appachan's Achar.

Cast

Episode list

 10 George agrees to do Feng Shui/Vasthu in his house.
 11 Mahesh and Babykuttan try out the dating scene.
 12 Gregory discovers his hidden talent.
 13 George gets a new pet for the house.
 14 George hires a handyman.
 15 Rincy plans a trip to India.
 16 Babykuttan joins Sameway (a multi-layer marketing company).
 17 Babykuttan tries to be a Sameway Millionaire.
 18 George has a "small party" while Rincy is away.
 19 Rincy returns with Appachan.
 20 Matt grows up.
 21 George and Family gets invited to a party.
 22 Gregory resigns.
 23 Gregory's first day at Blimpie.
 24 George's new assistant.
 25 Babykuttan learns to drive.
 26 Generation Gap
 27 Mahi tries to change career.
 28 George brings a superstar home.
 29 The Candy Problem
 30 Appachan and Giri Giri's new hobby.
 31 Appachan's Krishi
 32 Appachan's Achar
 33 Omana Onam 2008
 34 Job Search. Car Search. Wife Search.
 35 Back to School
 36 Halloween
 37 Mahi's Dilemma
 38 The Rat Problem
 39 George goes to the Doctor
 40 Black Friday
 41 Rincy's brother visits
 42 Informercial episode
 43 Christmas Episode
 44 Appachan Babysits
 45 The Love Letter
 46 Appachan's Birthday
 47 DJ KJ Episode
 48 Going back Home
 49 Babykuttan's English Tutor
 50 George buys a New Benz

Film locations
 The house of George Thekkinmootil's family is located in Englewood which is Abi Varghese's real home 
 Mahi and Babykuttan stay in a house that is located in North Brunswick which is Ajayan Venugopalan's real home.

Akkara Kazchakal - The Movie

Following the success of Akkara Kazhchakal, the team planned to release a movie calling it Akkara Kazhchakal - the movie. The movie was released in the United States on 29 April 2011, and produced by Infamous Coconuts & BOM TV.

In the film, Thekkinmootil Family decides to move Appachan and Ammachi to an old age home in Kerala. Meanwhile, between the jobs and a new insurance office, George and Rincy finds it hard to spend time with the family. With Rincy, kids and Appachan complaining about a much needed break, George finally decides to take the family on a vacation to Niagara Falls.

Critical reviews
Nita Sathyendran of The Hindu said: "It looks like George has not only delivered on his promise but has also managed to endear himself to his viewers.". Jacob A. C. of Mathrubhumi said that "The victory of Akkara Kazhchakal lies in the fact that it was able to introduce the day to day life of an Malayali-American a lighter mood."

Viewership
This sitcom had an estimated 80,000 weekly viewers.

Show timing

DVD releases
A DVD of Akkara Kazhchakal was released during Onam 2008 celebrations of Kerala Association of New Jersey (KANJ) by the cast members.

See also
 Metro Park

References

External links
 "Infamous Coconuts" Abi Varghese shares his inspiration for Akkara Kazhchakal
 Akkara Kazhachakal at the Internet Movie Database

Indian television sitcoms
2008 Indian television series debuts
2010 Indian television series endings
Malayalam-language television shows